John Hardie may refer to:

 John Hardie (rugby union) (born 1988), New Zealand born Scottish rugby union player
 John Hardie (footballer) (born 1938), Scottish footballer
 John Leslie Hardie (1882–1956), Australian general

See also
 John Hardy (disambiguation)